is a passenger railway station located in the city of Nantan, Kyoto Prefecture, Japan, operated by West Japan Railway Company (JR West).

Lines

Station layout
The station consists of one island platform on an embankment. There is no station building and the station is unattended.

Platforms

History
Funaoka Station opened on 10 October 1953. With the privatization of the Japan National Railways (JNR) on April 1, 1987, the station came under the aegis of the West Japan Railway Company.

Passenger statistics
In fiscal 2018, the station was used by an average of 82 passengers daily.

Surrounding area
 Nantan Municipal Kawabe Elementary School

See also
List of railway stations in Japan

References

External links

 Station Official Site

Railway stations in Kyoto Prefecture
Sanin Main Line
Railway stations in Japan opened in 1953
Nantan, Kyoto